Andrei Genadyevich Voronkov (born 19 May 1967) is a Russian volleyball coach and former player. As a player, he won the Turkish championships in 1996–1998, 2002 and 2004. Since 2006 he works as a volleyball coach. Between 2013 and 2015 he was head coach of the Russian men's team.

Voronkov is married to a volleyball coach and former player. Their both daughters are also volleyball players. One of them, Irina Voronkova, is a member of the national team.

References

External links
 Поверить в Воронкова

1967 births
Living people
People from Slavsky District
Soviet men's volleyball players
Russian men's volleyball players
Russian volleyball coaches
Honoured Coaches of Russia
Sportspeople from Kaliningrad Oblast